Margaret of Anjou (1272 – 31 December 1299) was Countess of Anjou and Maine in her own right and Countess of Valois, Alençon and Perche by marriage. Margaret's father was King Charles II of Naples, whilst her husband was Charles, Count of Valois (third son of King Philip III of France), and her older brother was Saint Louis of Toulouse; her nephew was King Charles I of Hungary.

Born in 1272, Margaret was a daughter of Charles II of Naples and his queen Mary of Hungary, the daughter of Stephen V of Hungary. Her father ceded to her husband, Charles of Valois, the Counties of Anjou and Maine as her dowry. She married Charles of Valois, a son of Philip III of France, at Corbeil in August 1290. Their children included:
 Isabelle (1292–1309), wife of John III, Duke of Brittany
 Philip VI of France (c. 1293 - 1350)
 Joan of Valois
 Margaret of Valois (1295–1342)
 Charles II of Alençon (1297-1346)

Countess Margaret was succeeded by her eldest son.

References

Sources

1273 births
1299 deaths
Capetian House of Anjou
Countesses of Anjou
Countesses of Maine
Countesses of Chartres
13th-century French women
13th-century French people
French people of Greek descent
Daughters of kings